Pankow are a German rock band, founded in East Berlin in 1981. Their name came from the Berlin district of Pankow, which was once home to most of the officials of the East German government. The band's original lineup consisted of Jürgen Ehle, André Herzberg, Rainer Kirchmann, Jäcki Reznicek and Frank Hille. Other members were Stefan Dohanetz, Ingo York and Jens Jensen.

As their lyrics often contained criticism of the East German regime, they frequently encountered problems releasing their music. "Like many writers, they were among the established names of aesthetic subversion," the journalist Christoph Dieckmann wrote in a 1999 article published in Rolling Stone.

With the fall of the Iron Curtain and the associated open access to media outside Germany Pankow also moved briefly into the focus of the Anglo-American journalism. The U.S. historian Timothy W. Ryback, known for his 1990 published book Rock around the bloc: a history of rock music in Eastern Europe and the Soviet Union, characterized Pankow as one of two most prestigious and most professional groups of East Berlin's rock music scene, writing that they "originally showed the influence of the Rolling Stones, but has developed into a dynamic band that combines the energy of the Clash with the innovation of the Talking Heads."

In the song "Langeweile" ("Boredom"), the criticism was expressed in the words "Seen the same country too long, heard the same language too often, waited too long, hoped too much, bowed down to the old men too often". The song "Paule Panke" was banned by the state-run Amiga record label, while "Langeweile" was banned from radio airplay; however, the band performed both at every concert.

Pankow has occasionally been compared with the Rolling Stones  and have implemented many musical styles and theatrical projects in their history.

On November 3, 2011, Pankow commenced a 30-year anniversary tour.

Discography

Albums 
 1983: Kille Kille .....
 1985: Hans im Glück.
 1986: Keine Stars
 1988: Aufruhr in den Augen
 1989: Paule Panke – Ein Tag aus dem Leben eines Lehrlings. Live 1982
 1991: 10 Jahre Pankow (Best of)
 1994: Vierer Pack
 1995: Wetten, Du willst – die Hits (Best of)
 1996: Paparazzia
 1997: Am Rande vom Wahnsinn
 1999: Rock'n'Roll im Stadtpark (Best of)
 1999: Pankow 1983–1989 (Promo-Doppel-CD)
 2004: Die Original AMIGA-Alben (5er CD-Box)
 2004: Wieder auf der Straße (Live-Doppel-CD)
 2005: Komm, Karlineken, komm ..... (Best of)
 2006: Nur aus Spaß
 2011: In Aufruhr (Amiga)
 2011: Neuer Tag in Pankow (Buschfunk)
 2017: Aufruhr in den Augen Reloaded (Live)

Singles 
 1982: Inge Pawelczik / Egal
 1983: Die wundersame Geschichte von Gabi / Rock 'n' Roll im Stadtpark
 1985: Er will anders sein / Wetten du willst
 1985: Isolde / Gut Nacht
 1986: Wetten du willst / Er will anders sein
 1988: Langeweile / Aufruhr in den Augen
 1996: Am Rande vom Wahnsinn / Rita

Video 
 1992: 10 Jahre Pankow

DVD 
 2004: Die wundersame Geschichte von Pankow

Bibliography

References

External links 

  
 
 
 
 
 
 André Herzberg - Website
 Jürgen Ehle - Website
 Jäcki Reznicek - Website
 Rainer Kirchmann - Website
 

German rock music groups
East German musical groups
Musical groups from Berlin
Musical groups established in 1981
1981 establishments in East Germany